This is a list of episodes for Season 3 of Late Night with Conan O'Brien, which aired from September 11, 1995, to September 13, 1996.

Series overview

Season 3

References

Episodes (season 03)